The 1903–04 Kansas Jayhawks men's basketball team represented the University of Kansas in its sixth season of collegiate basketball. The head coach was James Naismith, the inventor of the game, who served his 6th year. The Jayhawks finished the season 5–8.

Roster
Ira Adams
Harry Allen
Frank Barlow
Andrew Brown
Arthur Cook
John Fleischman
Adessie Griggs
Albert Hicks
James McCauley
Manley Michaelson
William Piatt
Arthur Pooler
Richard Priest

Schedule

References

Kansas Jayhawks men's basketball seasons
Kansas
Kansas
Kansas